Santaishan Palaung Ethnic Township is an ethnic township in Mangshi, Yunnan, China. It is bordered to the north by Xuangang Township, to the east by the towns of Mengga and Fengping, to the south by Zhefang Town, to the west by Wuchalu Township, and to the northwest by Town.

Administrative division
As of December 2015, the township is divided into 4 villages: 
 Bangwai
 Mengdan
 Chudonggua
 Yunqian

History
The township was set up in January 1988.

Geography

Economy
The local economy is primarily based upon agriculture and animal husbandry.

Transport
The town is connected to two highways: the National Highway G56, which heads southwest to Ruili City and G320, which heads northeast to the Dehong Mangshi Airport and the down Mangshi City.

References

Divisions of Mangshi